Hasanabad-e Pain is a village in South Khorasan Province, Iran.

Hasanabad-e Pain may also refer to:
 Hasanabad-e Pain, Fars
 Hasanabad-e Pain, Semirom, Isfahan Province
 Hasanabad-e Pain, Tiran and Karvan, Isfahan Province